Leśna  ( also Leschney; 1937–1945: Talheim) is a village in the administrative district of Gmina Lewin Kłodzki, within Kłodzko County, Lower Silesian Voivodeship, in south-western Poland.

The village has a population of 10 people.

References

Villages in Kłodzko County